Cefn Mawr is a village in the community of Cefn within Wrexham County Borough, Wales. Its name translates as "big ridge".  
The population in 2001 was 6,669, increasing to 7,051 in 2011.

The community of Cefn comprises the villages of Cefn Mawr, Cefn-bychan ("little ridge"), Acrefair, Penybryn, Newbridge, Plas Madoc and Rhosymedre and is situated on the northern slopes of the Dee Valley.

History 
Cefn Mawr was part of the ancient parish of Ruabon and the area was known as Cristionydd Cynrig (or Cristioneth Kenrick in English). In 1844, most of Cristionydd Cynrig, together with the neighbouring township of Coed Cristionydd became part of the new parish of Rhosymedre.

Cefn railway station served the village from 1848 to 1960.

Industry 

Cefn Mawr was formerly heavily industrialised, with large deposits of iron and coal and sandstone, and heavy industry dominated the area in the 18th and 19th centuries. Iron was worked at several blast furnaces and forges throughout the area and coal was mined at pits in Cefn, Plas Kynaston and Dolydd. Stone was cut at quarries above Cefn Mawr. Much of the mineral wealth of the area was exported by canal over the Pontcysyllte Aqueduct on the Shropshire Union Canal, until the railway reached Ruabon in 1855.

In 1867 Robert Ferdinand Graesser, an industrial chemist from Obermosel in Saxony, Germany, established a chemical works at Plas Kynaston to extract paraffin oil and paraffin wax from the local shale. The company later expanded into the production of coal tar, and carbolic acid (phenol). The site soon became the world's leading producer of phenol. In 1919 the US chemical company Monsanto entered into a partnership with Graesser's chemical works to produce vanillin, salicylic acid, aspirin, and later rubber processing chemicals. The site was later operated by Flexsys, a subsidiary of Solutia, but production ceased in 2010.
With the closure of the nearby Air Products and Chemicals site at Acrefair, manufacturing in the village has almost disappeared. A large Tesco store was opened in March 2012 on the former site of the village football team, Cefn Druids. After buying this land, Tesco agreed to contribute to the construction of the new football ground located half a mile (1 km) away near the neighbouring village of Rhosymedre.

Notable residents
Miles Thomas Chairman of BOAC was born here.
Peter Halliday (1924-2012) Actor well known for various appearances in British television series Doctor Who was born here.
Gareth Valentine (1956-) Musical Director, Composer in London's West End and worldwide lived here 1956–1975.

Leisure and education
Tŷ Mawr Country Park is located in the area, and features the Cefn Viaduct, built by Thomas Brassey in 1848 to carry the Shrewsbury and Chester Railway across the valley of the River Dee. The village has two primary schools: an English, Cefn Mawr County Primary School, and a Welsh, Ysgol Min Y Ddol. There is also a public library.

The community has 3 Football Teams Cefn Druids, Cefn Albion and Cefn Mawr Rangers F.C.

References

External links

BBC mini-site for Cefn Mawr 
180 Degree Panoramic View of Tŷ Mawr Country Park (BBC)  (Java Applet Required)
Historical recollections of Cefn Mawr
Monsanto website
NEWI Cefn Druids F.C.
photos of Cefn Mawr and surrounding area on geograph

Villages in Wrexham County Borough